Old Courthouse may refer to:

Australia 

 Old Court House, Perth, located in the Supreme Court Gardens in Barrack Street, Perth, Western Australia

Ireland
 Old Courthouse, Coleraine, Coleraine, County Londonderry, Northern Ireland

Malaysia
 Kuching Old Courthouse, Kuching, Sarawak, Malaysia

United Kingdom

 Old Court House Recreation Ground, a public park in High Barnet in the London Borough of Barnet
 The Old Court House, an eighteenth-century house in Richmond Upon Thames
 The Old Court House, Ruthin, Ruthin, Denbighshire, North Wales

United States 

 Old Hillsborough County Courthouse, Tampa, Florida
 Honolulu Courthouse, Honolulu, Hawaii, also known as the Old Courthouse after 1874
 Second St. Joseph County Courthouse, South Bend, Indiana, also known as Old Courthouse
 Old Courthouse (Greensburg, Kentucky), listed on the National Register of Historic Places (NRHP)
 Old Courthouse Square (Lake Providence, Louisiana), Lake Providence, Louisiana
 Old Courthouse Museum – Natchitoches, Natchitoches, Louisiana
 Old Warren County Courthouse, Vicksburg, Mississippi, also known as Old Courthouse
 Old Courthouse (St. Louis), in St. Louis, Missouri.
 Old Berkeley County Courthouse (South Carolina), Mount Pleasant, South Carolina, also known as Old Courthouse
 Old Newberry County Courthouse, Newberry, South Carolina, also known as Old Courthouse
 Old Courthouse and Warehouse Historic District, Sioux Falls, South Dakota, listed on the NRHP
 Fredericksburg Memorial Library, Fredericksburg, Texas, also known as Old Courthouse
 Old Courthouse (Buena Vista, Virginia)
 Dickensonville, Virginia, formerly known as Old Court House